Grigory Maksimovich Bongard-Levin (1933–2008) was a Russian historian specializing on Ancient India and the history of Central Asia. He also published on the history of Russian emigration. He was a member of the Russian Academy of Sciences and was awarded the USSR State Prize in 1988. In 2006 he was awarded India's third highest civilian award Padma Bhushan which ranked below Bharat Ratna and Padma Vibhushan for his contribution in the field of Ancient India history

Works 
 1981, The Origin of the Aryans, Prometheus Books, 
 1985, Ancient Indian Civilization Древнеиндийская цивилизация, Humanities Press, 
 1986, Complex Study of Ancient India: A Multi Disciplinary Approach, South Asia Books 
 1986, Mauryan India, Stosius Inc/Advent Books Division, 
 2001, Древняя Индия, История и культура (Ancient India, history and culture), Aletejya,

References 

20th-century Russian historians
1933 births
2008 deaths
Russian Indologists
Full Members of the USSR Academy of Sciences
Full Members of the Russian Academy of Sciences
Recipients of the Padma Bhushan in literature & education
Burials in Troyekurovskoye Cemetery
Academic staff of Moscow State University